Limoncito is a small town in the Santa Cruz Department in Bolivia.

References

Populated places in Santa Cruz Department (Bolivia)